Christian Binder (born 13 November 1962) is an Austrian sailor. He competed at the 1988 Summer Olympics and the 1992 Summer Olympics.

References

External links
 

1962 births
Living people
Austrian male sailors (sport)
Olympic sailors of Austria
Sailors at the 1988 Summer Olympics – 470
Sailors at the 1992 Summer Olympics – 470
Sportspeople from Vienna